Clementine is an 2019 American romantic drama film written and directed by Lara Gallagher. It stars Otmara Marrero, Sydney Sweeney, Will Brittain and Sonya Walger.

The film had its world premiere at the Tribeca Film Festival on April 27, 2019. It was released on May 8, 2020 to virtual cinemas, by Oscilloscope because of the COVID-19 pandemic.

Plot
Karen (Marrero), reeling from the end of a same-sex relationship, seeks refuge in her ex's lake house and meets Lana (Sweeney), a provocative young woman with whom she explores a complicated new relationship.

Cast
 Otmara Marrero as Karen
 Sydney Sweeney as Lana
 Will Brittain as Beau
 Sonya Walger as D.

Production
In October 2017, it was announced Otmara Marrero, Sydney Sweeney, Will Brittain, and Sonya Walger joined the cast of the film, with Lara Gallagher directing from a screenplay she wrote. Aimee Lynn Barneburg, Karina Ripper, and Davis Priestley are producing while Kim Bailey and Isabel Marden will serve as executive producers. Filming took place in Portland, Oregon.

Release
The film had its world premiere at the Tribeca Film Festival on April 27, 2019. Shortly after, Oscilloscope acquired U.S. distribution rights to the film. It is scheduled to be released on May 8, 2020.

Critical response
Clementine received mixed to positive reviews. The website's critics consensus reads: "Clementine struggles to engage as an erotic thriller, but is often held together by the well-acted friendship at its core." On Metacritic, the film has a score of 55 out of 100, based on twelve critic reviews, indicating "mixed or average reviews". The film received positive reviews from critics, who praised Sweeney and Marreo's chemistry and Gallagher's direction, but criticized the script.

References

External links
 

2019 films
2019 LGBT-related films
2019 romantic drama films
American LGBT-related films
American romantic drama films
Films shot in Portland, Oregon
Lesbian-related films
LGBT-related romantic drama films
2010s English-language films
2010s American films